Galium laevigatum is a species of plants in the Rubiaceae. It is native to the mountains of southern and Central Europe: the Alps, the Pyrenees and the Apennines. It has been recorded from Italy, Switzerland, France, Spain, Portugal, Austria, Slovenia and Croatia.

Galium laevigatum is a fairly large plant for the genus, erect and up to 110 cm tall, often reproducing by means of stolons running along the surface of the ground. Leaves are in whorls of 6–8, each lanceolate and up to 8 cm long. Flowers are white, borne in a large terminal panicle.

References

External links
Flora, Catalogazione floristica per la didattica, Sezione di Biologia Vegetale, DIPI, Università di Udine, Galium laevigatum 
Info Flora, Centro Nazionale di dati e informazioni della Flora Svizzera, Galium laevigatum
Botanik im Bild  /  Flora von Österreich, Liechtenstein und Südtirol, Glatt-Labkraut  /  "Glattes Labkraut", Galium laevigatum 

laevigatum
Flora of Italy
Flora of Croatia
Flora of Slovenia
Flora of Portugal
Flora of Austria
Flora of Spain
Flora of France
Flora of Switzerland
Flora of the Alps
Flora of the Pyrenees
Apennine Mountains
Plants described in 1763
Taxa named by Carl Linnaeus